Water polo events were contested at the 1991 Summer Universiade in Sheffield, England.

References
 Universiade water polo medalists on HickokSports

1991 Summer Universiade
Universiade
1991
1991